Antonio Lee "A. J." Davis Jr. (born March 15, 1995) is an American professional basketball player for Apollon Patras of the Greek Basket League. He played college basketball for Tennessee and UCF.

Early life and high school
Davis was born in Indianapolis, Indiana while his father was playing for the Indiana Pacers and moved around often during his father's career until settling in Atlanta after his retirement. He began high school at Greater Atlanta Christian School, where he helped the Spartans win back-to-back Georgia High School Association (GHSA) state titles, before transferring to Buford High School before his junior year.

College career

Tennessee
Davis began his collegiate career at Tennessee and averaged 1.3 points, 1.6 rebounds and 9.4 minutes in 25 games as a freshman. He announced that he would be transferring to the University of Central Florida after the end of his freshman season.

UCF
After sitting out his sophomore season due to NCAA transfer rules, Davis played three seasons for the Knights. As a redshirt senior, he averaged 12.2 points, 7.6 rebounds (3rd-best in the AAC) and 2.2 assists per game in 33 games (all starts) and was named honorable mention All-American Athletic Conference. Over the course of his collegiate career, Davis scored 1,030 points (33 at Tennessee, 997 at UCF) and finished 8th in UCF history with 633 rebounds and 7th with 319 made free throws. Following his redshirt senior season, Davis participated in the Portsmouth Invitational Tournament.

Professional career

Prishtina
Davis signed with KB Prishtina of the Kosovo Basketball Superleague on September 5, 2018. Davis averaged 8.3 points, 5.7 rebounds and 1.9 assists in nine Superleague games, 11.8 points and 3.5 rebounds in eight FIBA Europe Cup games and 21 points and 7.0 rebounds in two Champions League games.

Brisbane Bullets
Davis signed with the Brisbane Bullets of the Australian National Basketball League (NBL) on January 4, 2019. He averaged 3.8 points and 1.8 rebounds in 12 games for the Bullets.

Delaware Blue Coats
On March 7, 2019, the Delaware Blue Coats of the NBA G League announced that they had acquired Davis off waivers. Davis appeared in two games with Delaware, scoring three points with six rebounds, while staying on their roster through the end of the 2018-19 NBA G League season. Following the season the Philadelphia 76ers named Davis to their Summer League roster.

Stockton Kings
Davis was acquired from the G League player pool by the Stockton Kings on November 25, 2019.

Real Estelí
Davis signed with Real Estelí Baloncesto of the Nicaraguan Liga Superior de Baloncesto on January 4, 2020.

BC Luleå
On September 25, 2020, Davis signed with BC Luleå of the Swedish league.

Charilaos Trikoupis
Davis spent the latter half of the 2020-2021 season with Greek club Charilaos Trikoupis.

Mauricio Báez club
Davis was part of the team that was crowned champion of the Dominican Torneo Superior de Baloncesto, after beating the team of the San Lázaro club 78–73. Davis with 26 points, six rebounds and four assists in the final.

Niagara River Lions
On April 26, 2022, Davis signed with the Niagara River Lions of the CEBL.

Apollon Patras
On August 20, 2022, Davis returned to Greece after his brief stint with Trikoupis in early 2021, signing this time around with Apollon Patras.

Personal life
Davis is the son of former NBA All-Star Antonio Davis. His twin sister, Kaela Davis, currently plays for the Dallas Wings of the WNBA.

References

External links
Tennessee Volunteers bio
UCF Knights bio
RealGM profile
EuroBasket profile

1995 births
Living people
African-American basketball players
American expatriate basketball people in Australia
American expatriate basketball people in Canada
American expatriate basketball people in Germany
American expatriate basketball people in Greece
American expatriate basketball people in Kosovo
American expatriate basketball people in Nicaragua
American expatriate basketball people in Sweden
American expatriate basketball people in the Dominican Republic
American men's basketball players
Apollon Patras B.C. players
Basketball players from Indianapolis
Brisbane Bullets players
Charilaos Trikoupis B.C. players
Delaware Blue Coats players
KB Prishtina players
Niagara River Lions players
Power forwards (basketball)
Small forwards
Stockton Kings players
Tennessee Volunteers basketball players
UCF Knights men's basketball players
21st-century African-American sportspeople
Twin sportspeople
Fraternal twins